Velvet Tone Records was an American record label that was founded by Columbia Records in 1925 and shut down in 1932. Velvet Tone contained material identical to that of Columbia's two other low price labels, Harmony Records and Diva Records (and after Diva was discontinued, Clarion Records).

Popular culture
 In Frank Capra's 1946 film, It's a Wonderful Life, Mary can be seen playing a record with a "Velvet Tone" label on the phonograph. A close examination reveals that it is "Buffalo Gals" performed by "Arthur Black and His Orchestra".  However, the label's design is inconsistent with actual Velvet Tone labels. The prop record is a nod towards the film's assistant director, Arthur Black.

See also
 List of record labels

References

External links
Velvet Tone Records on the Internet Archive's Great 78 Project

American record labels
Record labels established in 1925
Record labels disestablished in 1932
Jazz record labels